Amber Kelleher-Andrews is a relationship matchmaker. She is the co-founder and CEO of Kelleher International, one of the largest matchmaking firms in the United States.

In 2013, she was a matchmaker on NBC's Ready for Love.

Education and early career
Kelleher-Andrews studied anthropology in the California State education program at Santa Barbara. Shortly afterwards, she joined film school in San Francisco before moving to Hollywood. Credited as Amber Van Lent, Kelleher-Andrews appeared in films such as Bloodsport III, Mind Rage, and Lying Eyes. She also had roles on TV shows including Baywatch, Melrose Place, and Nash Bridges.

Career
In 1997, she joined her mother’s matchmaking business, Kelleher International, as the CEO of the Los Angeles office.

In addition to her role as CEO, Kelleher-Andrews is an expert relationship consultant on television programs including Good Morning America, the Today Show, and 20/20.

Kelleher-Andrews also hosted a radio talk show called The Rules of Engagement on KFWB News Talk 980. She appeared as a matchmaker on NBC's Ready for Love in 2013.

Filmography

Television
Ready for Love (2013)
Baywatch (1998)
Nash Bridges (1997) 
The Jeff Foxworthy Show (1995)
Married... with Children (1994)
Melrose Place (1994)
Silk Stalkings (1993)
Herman's Head (1992)
Wings (1992)
Round Trip to Heaven (1992)
Human Target (1992)
Baby Talk (1991)

TV Movies
Lying Eyes (1996)
Bloodsport III (1996)
Marilyn & Bobby; Her Final Affair (1993)

Film
Mind Rage (2004)

References

External links
Official site

Huffington Post
SFGate

Living people
Matchmakers
Year of birth missing (living people)